Yasodhaman II (317–332) was a son and probably sub-king of king Rudrasimha II of the Western Satraps He declared on his coins to be the son of Rudrasimha II.

He was succeeded by another of Rudrasimha II's sons Rudradaman II (332–348).

During his rule, a Saka ruler inscribed the  Kanakerha inscription, on the hill of Sanchi mentioning the construction of a well by the Saka chief and "righteous conqueror" (dharmaviyagi mahadandanayaka) Sridharavarman (339-368 CE). Another inscription of the same Sridhavarman with his military commander is known from Eran. These inscription point to the extent of Saka rule as the time of Rudrasimha II and Yasodhaman II.

References

Western Satraps
4th-century monarchs in Asia